

Africa

President – Abdelaziz Bouteflika, President of Algeria (1999–2019)
Prime Minister – Abdelmalek Sellal, Prime Minister of Algeria (2014–2017)

President – José Eduardo dos Santos, President of Angola (1979–2017)

President –
Thomas Boni Yayi, President of Benin (2006–2016)
Patrice Talon, President of Benin (2016–present)
Prime Minister – Lionel Zinsou, Prime Minister of Benin (2015–2016)

President – Ian Khama, President of Botswana (2008–2018)

President – Roch Marc Christian Kaboré, President of Burkina Faso (2015–2022)
Prime Minister – Paul Kaba Thieba, Prime Minister of Burkina Faso (2016–2019)

President – Pierre Nkurunziza, President of Burundi (2005–2020)

President – Paul Biya, President of Cameroon (1982–present)
Prime Minister – Philémon Yang, Prime Minister of Cameroon (2009–2019)

President – Jorge Carlos Fonseca, President of Cape Verde (2011–2021)
Prime Minister –
José Maria Neves, Prime Minister of Cape Verde (2001–2016)
Ulisses Correia e Silva, Prime Minister of Cape Verde (2016–present)

Head of State –
Catherine Samba-Panza, Head of State of the Transition of the Central African Republic (2014–2016)
Faustin-Archange Touadéra, President of the Central African Republic (2016–present)
Prime Minister –
Mahamat Kamoun, Prime Minister of the Central African Republic (2014–2016)
Simplice Sarandji, Prime Minister of the Central African Republic (2016-2019)

President – Idriss Déby, President of Chad (1990–2021)
Prime Minister –
Kalzeubet Pahimi Deubet, Prime Minister of Chad (2013–2016)
Albert Pahimi Padacké, Prime Minister of Chad (2016–2018)

President –
Ikililou Dhoinine, President of the Comoros (2011–2016)
Azali Assoumani, President of the Comoros (2016–present)

President – Denis Sassou Nguesso, President of the Republic of the Congo (1997–present)
Prime Minister – Clément Mouamba, Prime Minister of the Republic of the Congo (2016–2021)

President – Joseph Kabila, President of the Democratic Republic of the Congo (2001–2019)
Prime Minister –
Augustin Matata Ponyo, Prime Minister of the Democratic Republic of the Congo (2012–2016)
Samy Badibanga, Prime Minister of the Democratic Republic of the Congo (2016–2017)

President – Ismaïl Omar Guelleh, President of Djibouti (1999–present)
Prime Minister – Abdoulkader Kamil Mohamed, Prime Minister of Djibouti (2013–present)

President – Abdel Fattah el-Sisi, President of Egypt (2014–present)
Prime Minister – Sherif Ismail, Prime Minister of Egypt (2015–2018)

President – Teodoro Obiang Nguema Mbasogo, President of Equatorial Guinea (1979–present)
Prime Minister –
Vicente Ehate Tomi, Prime Minister of Equatorial Guinea (2012–2016)
Francisco Pascual Obama Asue, Prime Minister of Equatorial Guinea (2016–present)

President – Isaias Afwerki, President of Eritrea (1991–present)

President – Mulatu Teshome, President of Ethiopia (2013–present)
Prime Minister – Hailemariam Desalegn, Prime Minister of Ethiopia (2012–2018)

President – Ali Bongo Ondimba, President of Gabon (2009–present)
Prime Minister –
Daniel Ona Ondo, Prime Minister of Gabon (2014–2016)
Emmanuel Issoze-Ngondet, Prime Minister of Gabon (2016–2019)

President – Yahya Jammeh, President of the Gambia (1994–2017)

President – John Dramani Mahama, President of Ghana (2012–2017)

President – Alpha Condé, President of Guinea (2010–2021)
Prime Minister – Mamady Youla, Prime Minister of Guinea (2015–2018)

President – José Mário Vaz, President of Guinea-Bissau (2014–2019)
Prime Minister –
Carlos Correia, Prime Minister of Guinea-Bissau (2015–2016)
Baciro Djá, Prime Minister of Guinea-Bissau (2016)
Umaro Sissoco Embaló, Prime Minister of Guinea-Bissau (2016–2018)

President – Alassane Ouattara, President of the Ivory Coast (2010–present)
Prime Minister – Daniel Kablan Duncan, Prime Minister of the Ivory Coast (2012–2017)

President – Uhuru Kenyatta, President of Kenya (2013–present)

Monarch – Letsie III, King of Lesotho (1996–present)
Prime Minister – Pakalitha Mosisili, Prime Minister of Lesotho (2015–2017)

President – Ellen Johnson Sirleaf, President of Liberia (2006–2018)
Libya
 Government of House of Representatives of Libya  (Government of Libya internationally recognized to 12 March 2016)
Head of State – Aguila Saleh Issa, Chairman of the House of Representatives of Libya (co-claimant, 2014–2021)
Prime Minister – Abdullah al-Thani, Prime Minister of Libya (co-claimant, 2014–2021)
 National Salvation Government of Libya, government of General National Congress of Libya (Government of Libya in rebellion internationally unrecognized.)
Head of State – Nouri Abusahmain, Chairman of the New General National Congress of Libya (2013–2014; co-claimant, 2014–2016)
Prime Minister – Khalifa al-Ghawi, Prime Minister of Libya (co-claimant, 2015–2016, 2016)
  Government of National Accord of Libya  (Interim government internationally recognized as the sole legitimate government of Libya from 12 March 2016)
Head of State – Fayez al-Sarraj, Chairman of the Presidential Council of Libya (co-claimant, 2016–2021)
Prime Minister – Fayez al-Sarraj, Prime Minister of Libya (co-claimant, 2016–2021)

President – Hery Rajaonarimampianina, President of Madagascar (2014–2018)
Prime Minister –
Jean Ravelonarivo, Prime Minister of Madagascar (2015–2016)
Olivier Mahafaly Solonandrasana, Prime Minister of Madagascar (2016–2018)

President – Peter Mutharika, President of Malawi (2014–2020)

President – Ibrahim Boubacar Keïta, President of Mali (2013–2020)
Prime Minister – Modibo Keita, Prime Minister of Mali (2015–2017)

President – Mohamed Ould Abdel Aziz, President of Mauritania (2009–2019)
Prime Minister – Yahya Ould Hademine, Prime Minister of Mauritania (2014-2018)

President – Ameenah Gurib, President of Mauritius (2015–2018)
Prime Minister – Sir Anerood Jugnauth, Prime Minister of Mauritius (2014–2017)

Monarch – Mohammed VI, King of Morocco (1999–present)
Prime Minister – Abdelilah Benkirane, Head of Government of Morocco (2011–2017)

President – Filipe Nyusi, President of Mozambique (2015–present)
Prime Minister – Carlos Agostinho do Rosário, Prime Minister of Mozambique (2015–2022)

President – Hage Geingob, President of Namibia (2015–present)
Prime Minister – Saara Kuugongelwa, Prime Minister of Namibia (2015–present)

President – Mahamadou Issoufou, President of Niger (2011–2021)
Prime Minister – Brigi Rafini, Prime Minister of Niger (2011–2021)

President –
Muhammadu Buhari, President of Nigeria (2015–present)
Yemi Osinbajo, Acting President of Nigeria (2016)
 (self-declared autonomous state)
President – Abdiweli Mohamed Ali, President of Puntland (2014–2019)

President – Paul Kagame, President of Rwanda (2000–present)
Prime Minister – Anastase Murekezi, Prime Minister of Rwanda (2014–2017)
 (Overseas Territory of the United Kingdom)
Governor –
Mark Andrew Capes, Governor of Saint Helena (2011–2016)
Sean Burns, Acting Governor of Saint Helena (2016)
Lisa Phillips, Governor of Saint Helena (2016–2019)

President – 
Manuel Pinto da Costa, President of São Tomé and Príncipe (2011–2016)
Evaristo Carvalho, President of São Tomé and Príncipe (2016–2021)
Prime Minister – Patrice Trovoada, Prime Minister of São Tomé and Príncipe (2014–present)

President – Macky Sall, President of Senegal (2012–present)
Prime Minister – Mohammed Dionne, Prime Minister of Senegal (2014–2019)

President – 
James Michel, President of Seychelles (2004–2016)
Danny Faure, President of Seychelles (2016–2020)

President – Ernest Bai Koroma, President of Sierra Leone (2007–2018)

President – Hassan Sheikh Mohamud, President of Somalia (2012–2017)
Prime Minister – Omar Abdirashid Ali Sharmarke, Prime Minister of Somalia (2014–2017)
 (unrecognised, secessionist state)
President – Ahmed Mohamed Mohamoud, President of Somaliland (2010–2017)

President – Jacob Zuma, President of South Africa (2009–2018)

President – Salva Kiir Mayardit, President of South Sudan (2005–present)

President – Omar al-Bashir, President of Sudan (1989–2019)

Monarch – Mswati III, King of Swaziland (1986–present)
Prime Minister – Barnabas Sibusiso Dlamini, Prime Minister of Swaziland (2008–2018)

President – John Magufuli, President of Tanzania (2015–2021)
Prime Minister – Kassim Majaliwa, Prime Minister of Tanzania (2015–present)

President – Faure Gnassingbé, President of Togo (2005–present)
Prime Minister – Komi Sélom Klassou, Prime Minister of Togo (2015–2020)

President – Beji Caid Essebsi, President of Tunisia (2014–2019)
Prime Minister –
Habib Essid, Head of Government of Tunisia (2015–2016)
Youssef Chahed, Head of Government of Tunisia (2016–2020)

President – Yoweri Museveni, President of Uganda (1986–present)
Prime Minister – Ruhakana Rugunda, Prime Minister of Uganda (2014–2021)
 (self-declared, partially recognised state)
President –
Mohamed Abdelaziz, President of Western Sahara (1976–2016)
Khatri Addouh, Acting President of Western Sahara (2016)
Brahim Ghali, President of Western Sahara (2016–present)
Prime Minister – Abdelkader Taleb Omar, Prime Minister of Western Sahara (2003–2018)

President – Edgar Lungu, President of Zambia (2015–20251)

President – Robert Mugabe, President of Zimbabwe (1987–2017)

Asia

President – Ashraf Ghani, President of Afghanistan (2014–2021)
Prime Minister – Abdullah Abdullah, chief executive officer of Afghanistan (2014–2020)

Monarch – Sheikh Hamad bin Isa Al Khalifa, King of Bahrain (1999–present)
Prime Minister – Prince Khalifa bin Salman Al Khalifa, Prime Minister of Bahrain (1970–202)

President – Abdul Hamid, President of Bangladesh (2013–present)
Prime Minister – Sheikh Hasina, Prime Minister of Bangladesh (2009–present)

Monarch – Jigme Khesar Namgyel Wangchuck, King of Bhutan (2006–present)
Prime Minister – Tshering Tobgay, Prime Minister of Bhutan (2013–2018)

Monarch – Hassanal Bolkiah, Sultan of Brunei (1967–present)
Prime Minister – Hassanal Bolkiah, Prime Minister of Brunei (1984–present)

Monarch – Norodom Sihamoni, King of Cambodia (2004–present)
Prime Minister – Hun Sen, Prime Minister of Cambodia (1985–present)

Communist Party Leader – Xi Jinping, General Secretary of the Chinese Communist Party (2012–present)
President – Xi Jinping, President of China (2013–present)
Premier – Li Keqiang, Premier of the State Council of China (2013–present)

President – Taur Matan Ruak, President of East Timor (2012–2017)
Prime Minister – Rui Maria de Araújo, Prime Minister of East Timor (2015–2017)

President – Pranab Mukherjee, President of India (2012–2017)
Prime Minister – Narendra Modi, Prime Minister of India (2014–present)

President – Joko Widodo, President of Indonesia (2014–present)

Supreme Leader – Ayatollah Ali Khamenei, Supreme Leader of Iran (1989–present)
President – Hassan Rouhani, President of Iran (2013–2021)

President – Fuad Masum, President of Iraq (2014–2018)
Prime Minister – Haider al-Abadi, Prime Minister of Iraq (2014–present)

President – Reuven Rivlin, President of Israel (2014–2021)
Prime Minister – Benjamin Netanyahu, Prime Minister of Israel (2009–2021)

Monarch – Akihito, Emperor of Japan (1989–2019)
Prime Minister – Shinzō Abe, Prime Minister of Japan (2012–2020)

Monarch – Abdullah II, King of Jordan (1999–present)
Prime Minister –
Abdullah Ensour, Prime Minister of Jordan (2012–2016)
Hani Al-Mulki, Prime Minister of Jordan (2016–2018)

President – Nursultan Nazarbayev, President of Kazakhstan (1990–2019)
Prime Minister –
 Karim Massimov, Prime Minister of Kazakhstan (2014–2016)
 Bakhytzhan Sagintayev, Prime Minister of Kazakhstan (2016–2019)

Communist Party Leader – Kim Jong-un, Chairman of the Workers' Party of Korea (2012–present)
De facto Head of State – Kim Jong-un, Chairman of the State Affairs Commission of North Korea (2011–present)
De jure Head of State – Kim Yong-nam, Chairman of the Presidium of the Supreme People's Assembly of North Korea (1998–2019)
Premier – Pak Pong-ju, Premier of the Cabinet of North Korea (2013–2019)

President –
Park Geun-hye, President of South Korea (2013–2017)
Hwang Kyo-ahn, Acting President of South Korea (2016–2017)
Prime Minister – Hwang Kyo-ahn, Prime Minister of South Korea (2015–2017)

Monarch – Sheikh Sabah Al-Ahmad Al-Jaber Al-Sabah, Emir of Kuwait (2006–2020)
Prime Minister – Sheikh Jaber Al-Mubarak Al-Hamad Al-Sabah, Prime Minister of Kuwait (2011–2019)

President – Almazbek Atambayev, President of Kyrgyzstan (2011–2017)
Prime Minister –
Temir Sariyev, Prime Minister of Kyrgyzstan (2015–2016)
Sooronbay Jeenbekov, Prime Minister of Kyrgyzstan (2016–2017)

Communist Party Leader –
Choummaly Sayasone, General Secretary of the Lao People's Revolutionary Party (2006–2016)
Bounnhang Vorachith, General Secretary of the Lao People's Revolutionary Party (2016–2021)
President –
 Choummaly Sayasone, President of Laos (2006–2016)
 Bounnhang Vorachith, President of Laos (2016–2021)
Prime Minister –
Thongsing Thammavong, Chairman of the Council of Ministers of Laos (2010–2016)
Thongloun Sisoulith, Chairman of the Council of Ministers of Laos (2016–2021)

President –
Tammam Salam, Acting President of Lebanon (2014–2016)
Michel Aoun, President of Lebanon (2016–2022)
Prime Minister –
Tammam Salam, President of the Council of Ministers of Lebanon (2014–2016)
Saad Hariri, President of the Council of Ministers of Lebanon (2016–2020)

Monarch –
 Tuanku Abdul Halim, Yang di-Pertuan Agong of Malaysia (2011–2016)
 Muhammad V, Yang di-Pertuan Agong of Malaysia (2016–2019)
Prime Minister – Najib Razak, Prime Minister of Malaysia (2009–2018)

President – Abdulla Yameen, President of the Maldives (2013–2018)

President – Tsakhiagiin Elbegdorj, President of Mongolia (2009–2017)
Prime Minister –
Chimediin Saikhanbileg, Prime Minister of Mongolia (2014–2016)
Jargaltulgyn Erdenebat, Prime Minister of Mongolia (2016–2017)

President –
Thein Sein, President of Myanmar (2011–2016)
Htin Kyaw, President of Myanmar (2016–2018)
Prime Minister – Aung San Suu Kyi, State Counsellor of Myanmar (2016–2021)

President – Bidhya Devi Bhandari, President of Nepal (2015–present)
Prime Minister –
Khadga Prasad Oli, Prime Minister of Nepal (2015–2016)
Pushpa Kamal Dahal, Prime Minister of Nepal (2016–2017)

Monarch – Qaboos bin Said al Said, Sultan of Oman (1970–2020)
Prime Minister – Qaboos bin Said al Said, Prime Minister of Oman (1972–2020)

President – Mamnoon Hussain, President of Pakistan (2013–2018)
Prime Minister – Nawaz Sharif, Prime Minister of Pakistan (2013–2017)

President – Mahmoud Abbas, President of Palestine (2005–present)
Prime Minister – Rami Hamdallah, Prime Minister of Palestine (2013–2019)

President – 
Benigno Aquino, President of the Philippines (2010–2016)
Rodrigo Duterte, President of the Philippines (2016–present)

Monarch – Sheikh Tamim bin Hamad Al Thani, Emir of Qatar (2013–present)
Prime Minister – Sheikh Abdullah bin Nasser bin Khalifa Al Thani, Prime Minister of Qatar (2013–2020)

Monarch – Salman, King of Saudi Arabia (2015–present)
Prime Minister – Salman, Prime Minister of Saudi Arabia (2015–2022)

President – Tony Tan, President of Singapore (2011–2017)
Prime Minister – Lee Hsien Loong, Prime Minister of Singapore (2004–present)

President – Maithripala Sirisena, President of Sri Lanka (2015–2019)
Prime Minister – Ranil Wickremesinghe, Prime Minister of Sri Lanka (2015–2018)
Syria

President – Bashar al-Assad, President of Syria (2000–present)
Prime Minister –
Wael Nader al-Halqi, Prime Minister of Syria (2012–2016)
Imad Khamis, Prime Minister of Syria (2016–2020)
 (partially recognised, rival government)
President –
Khaled Khoja, President of the Syrian National Coalition (2015–2016)
Anas al-Abdah, President of the Syrian National Coalition (2016–2017)
Prime Minister – 
Ahmad Tu'mah, Prime Minister of the Syrian National Coalition (2014–2016)
Jawad Abu Hatab, Prime Minister of the Syrian National Coalition (2016–2019)

President –
Ma Ying-jeou, President of Taiwan (2008–2016)
Tsai Ing-wen, President of Taiwan (2016–present)
Premier –
Mao Chi-kuo, President of the Executive Yuan of Taiwan (2014–2016)
Chang San-cheng, President of the Executive Yuan of Taiwan (2016)
Lin Chuan, President of the Executive Yuan of Taiwan (2016–2017)

President – Emomali Rahmon, President of Tajikistan (1992–present)
Prime Minister – Kokhir Rasulzoda, Prime Minister of Tajikistan (2013–present)

Monarch –
 Bhumibol Adulyadej, King of Thailand (1946–2016)
 Vajiralongkorn, King of Thailand (2016–present)
Regent – Prem Tinsulanonda, Regent of Thailand (2016)
Prime Minister – Prayut Chan-o-cha, Prime Minister of Thailand (2014–present)

President – Recep Tayyip Erdoğan, President of Turkey (2014–present)
Prime Minister –
Ahmet Davutoğlu, Prime Minister of Turkey (2014–2016)
Binali Yıldırım, Prime Minister of Turkey (2016–2018)

President – Gurbanguly Berdimuhamedow, President of Turkmenistan (2006–2022)

President – Sheikh Khalifa bin Zayed Al Nahyan, President of the United Arab Emirates (2004–2022)
Prime Minister – Sheikh Mohammed bin Rashid Al Maktoum, Prime Minister of the United Arab Emirates (2006–present)

President –
Islam Karimov, President of Uzbekistan (1990–2016)
Nigmatilla Yuldashev, Acting President of Uzbekistan (2016)
Shavkat Mirziyoyev, President of Uzbekistan (2016–present)
Prime Minister –
Shavkat Mirziyoyev, Prime Minister of Uzbekistan (2003–2016)
Abdulla Aripov, Prime Minister of Uzbekistan (2016–present)

Communist Party Leader – Nguyễn Phú Trọng, General Secretary of the Communist Party of Vietnam (2011–present)
President –
Trương Tấn Sang, President of Vietnam (2011–2016)
Trần Đại Quang, President of Vietnam (2016–2018)
Prime Minister
Nguyễn Tấn Dũng, Prime Minister of Vietnam (2006–2016)
Nguyễn Xuân Phúc, Prime Minister of Vietnam (2016–2021)
Yemen

President – Abdrabbuh Mansur Hadi, President of Yemen (2012–2022)
Prime Minister –
Khaled Bahah, Prime Minister of Yemen (2014–2016)
Ahmed Obeid bin Daghr, Prime Minister of Yemen (2016–2018)
  Supreme Revolutionary Committee of Yemen to 14 August 2016 then Supreme Political Council (unrecognised, rival government)
Head of State –
Mohammed Ali al-Houthi, Head of the Supreme Revolutionary Committee of Yemen (2015–2016)
Saleh Ali al-Sammad, Head of the Supreme Political Council of Yemen (2016–2018)
Prime Minister –
Talal Aklan, Acting Prime Minister of Yemen (2016)
Abdel-Aziz bin Habtour, Prime Minister of Yemen (2016–present)

Europe
 (partially recognised, secessionist state)
President – Raul Khajimba, President of Abkhazia (2014–2020)
Prime Minister –
Artur Mikvabia, Prime Minister of Abkhazia (2015–2016)
Shamil Adzynba, Acting Prime Minister of Abkhazia (2016)
Beslan Bartsits, Prime Minister of Abkhazia (2016–2018)

President – Bujar Nishani, President of Albania (2012–2017)
Prime Minister – Edi Rama, Prime Minister of Albania (2013–present)

Monarchs –
French Co-Prince – François Hollande, French Co-prince of Andorra (2012–2017)
Co-Prince's Representative –
Thierry Lataste (2015–2016)
Jean-Pierre Hugues (2016–2017)
Episcopal Co-Prince – Archbishop Joan Enric Vives Sicília, Episcopal Co-prince of Andorra (2003–present)
Co-Prince's Representative – Josep Maria Mauri (2012–present)
Prime Minister – Antoni Martí, Head of Government of Andorra (2015–2019)

President – Serzh Sargsyan, President of Armenia (2008–2018)
Prime Minister –
Hovik Abrahamyan, Prime Minister of Armenia (2014–2016)
Karen Karapetyan, Prime Minister of Armenia (2016–2018)

President –
Heinz Fischer, President of Austria (2004–2016)
Doris Bures, Karlheinz Kopf and Norbert Hofer, Joint Acting Presidents of Austria (2016–2017)
Chancellor –
 Werner Faymann, Chancellor of Austria (2008–2016)
 Reinhold Mitterlehner, Acting Chancellor of Austria (2016)
 Christian Kern, Chancellor of Austria (2016–2017)

President – Ilham Aliyev, President of Azerbaijan (2003–present)
Prime Minister – Artur Rasizade, Prime Minister of Azerbaijan (2003–2018)

President – Alexander Lukashenko, President of Belarus (1994–present)
Prime Minister – Andrei Kobyakov, Prime Minister of Belarus (2014–2018)

Monarch – Philippe, King of the Belgians (2013–present)
Prime Minister – Charles Michel, Prime Minister of Belgium (2014–2019)

Head of State – Presidency of Bosnia and Herzegovina
Croat Member – Dragan Čović (2014–2018; Chairman of the Presidency of Bosnia and Herzegovina, 2015–2016)
Bosniak Member – Bakir Izetbegović (2010–2018; Chairman of the Presidency of Bosnia and Herzegovina, 2016)
Serb Member – Mladen Ivanić (2014–2016; Chairman of the Presidency of Bosnia and Herzegovina, 2016–2017)
Prime Minister – Denis Zvizdić, Chairman of the Council of Ministers of Bosnia and Herzegovina (2015–2019)
High Representative – Valentin Inzko, High Representative for Bosnia and Herzegovina (2009–2021)

President – Rosen Plevneliev, President of Bulgaria (2012–2017)
Prime Minister – Boyko Borisov, Prime Minister of Bulgaria (2014–2017)

President – Kolinda Grabar-Kitarović, President of Croatia (2015–2020)
Prime Minister –
Zoran Milanović, Prime Minister of Croatia (2011–2016)
Tihomir Orešković, Prime Minister of Croatia (2016)
Andrej Plenković, Prime Minister of Croatia (2016–present)

President – Nicos Anastasiades, President of Cyprus (2013–present)

President – Miloš Zeman, President of the Czech Republic (2013–present)
Prime Minister – Bohuslav Sobotka, Prime Minister of the Czech Republic (2014–2017)

Monarch – Margrethe II, Queen of Denmark (1972–present)
Prime Minister – Lars Løkke Rasmussen, Prime Minister of Denmark (2015–2019)
 Donetsk People's Republic (unrecognised, secessionist state)
President – Alexander Zakharchenko, President of Donetsk People's Republic (2014–2018)
Prime Minister – Alexander Zakharchenko, Prime Minister of Donetsk People's Republic (2014–2018)

President –
Toomas Hendrik Ilves, President of Estonia (2006–2016)
Kersti Kaljulaid, President of Estonia (2016–2021)
Prime Minister –
Taavi Rõivas, Prime Minister of Estonia (2014–2016)
Jüri Ratas, Prime Minister of Estonia (2016–2021)

President – Sauli Niinistö, President of Finland (2012–present)
Prime Minister – Juha Sipilä, Prime Minister of Finland (2015–2019)

President – François Hollande, President of France (2012–2017)
Prime Minister –
Manuel Valls, Prime Minister of France (2014–2016)
Bernard Cazeneuve, Prime Minister of France (2016–2017)

President – Giorgi Margvelashvili, President of Georgia (2013–2018)
Prime Minister – Giorgi Kvirikashvili, Prime Minister of Georgia (2015–2018)

President – Joachim Gauck, Federal President of Germany (2012–2017)
Chancellor – Angela Merkel, Federal Chancellor of Germany (2005–2021)
 (Overseas Territory of the United Kingdom)
Governor –
Alison MacMillan, Acting Governor of Gibraltar (2015–2016)
Ed Davis, Governor of Gibraltar (2016–2020)
Chief Minister – Fabian Picardo, Chief Minister of Gibraltar (2011–present)

President – Prokopis Pavlopoulos, President of Greece (2015–2020)
Prime Minister – Alexis Tsipras, Prime Minister of Greece (2015–2019)
 (Crown dependency)
Lieutenant-Governor –
 Sir Richard Collas, Acting Lieutenant Governor of Guernsey (2015–2016)
 Sir Ian Corder, Lieutenant Governor of Guernsey (2016–present)
Chief Minister – Jonathan Le Tocq, Chief Minister of Guernsey (2014–2016)
President of the Policy and Resources Committee – Gavin St Pier, President of the Policy and Resources Committee (2016–2020)

President – János Áder, President of Hungary (2012–present)
Prime Minister – Viktor Orbán, Prime Minister of Hungary (2010–present)

President –
 Ólafur Ragnar Grímsson, President of Iceland (1996–2016)
 Guðni Th. Jóhannesson, President of Iceland (2016–present)
Prime Minister –
Sigmundur Davíð Gunnlaugsson, Prime Minister of Iceland (2013–2016)
Sigurður Ingi Jóhannsson, Prime Minister of Iceland (2016–2017)

President – Michael D. Higgins, President of Ireland (2011–present)
Prime Minister – Enda Kenny, Taoiseach of Ireland (2011–2017)
 (Crown dependency)
Lieutenant-Governor –
Adam Wood, Lieutenant Governor of the Isle of Man (2011–2016)
David Doyle, Acting Lieutenant Governor of the Isle of Man (2016)
Sir Richard Gozney, Lieutenant Governor of the Isle of Man (2016–present)
Chief Minister –
Allan Bell, Chief Minister of the Isle of Man (2011–2016)
Howard Quayle, Chief Minister of the Isle of Man (2016–present)

President – Sergio Mattarella, President of Italy (2015–present)
Prime Minister –
Matteo Renzi, President of the Council of Ministers of Italy (2014–2016)
Paolo Gentiloni, President of the Council of Ministers of Italy (2016–2018)
 (Crown dependency)
Lieutenant-Governor –
Sir John McColl, Lieutenant Governor of Jersey (2011–2016)
William Bailhache, Acting Lieutenant Governor of Jersey (2016–2017)
Chief Minister – Ian Gorst, Chief Minister of Jersey (2011–2018)
 (partially recognised, secessionist state; under nominal international administration)
President –
Atifete Jahjaga, President of Kosovo (2011–2016)
Hashim Thaçi, President of Kosovo (2016–2020)
Prime Minister – Isa Mustafa, Prime Minister of Kosovo (2014–2017)
UN Special Representative – Zahir Tanin, Special Representative of the UN Secretary-General for Kosovo (2015–present)

President – Raimonds Vējonis, President of Latvia (2015–2019)
Prime Minister –
Laimdota Straujuma, Prime Minister of Latvia (2014–2016)
Māris Kučinskis, Prime Minister of Latvia (2016–2019)

Monarch – Hans-Adam II, Prince Regnant of Liechtenstein (1989–present)
Regent – Hereditary Prince Alois, Regent of Liechtenstein (2004–present)
Prime Minister – Adrian Hasler, Head of Government of Liechtenstein (2013–2021)

President – Dalia Grybauskaitė, President of Lithuania (2009–2019)
Prime Minister –
Algirdas Butkevičius, Prime Minister of Lithuania (2012–2016)
Saulius Skvernelis, Prime Minister of Lithuania (2016–2020)
 Luhansk People's Republic (unrecognised, secessionist state)
President – Igor Plotnitsky, Head of state of Luhansk People's Republic (2014–2017)
Prime Minister – Sergey Kozlov, Prime Minister of Luhansk People's Republic (2015–present)

Monarch – Henri, Grand Duke of Luxembourg (2000–present)
Prime Minister – Xavier Bettel, Prime Minister of Luxembourg (2013–present)

President – Gjorge Ivanov, President of Macedonia (2009–2019)
Prime Minister –
Nikola Gruevski, President of the Government of Macedonia (2006–2016)
Emil Dimitriev, Acting President of the Government of Macedonia (2016–2017)

President – Marie Louise Coleiro Preca, President of Malta (2014–2019)
Prime Minister – Joseph Muscat, Prime Minister of Malta (2013–2020)

President –
Nicolae Timofti, President of Moldova (2012–2016)
Igor Dodon, President of Moldova (2016–2020)
Prime Minister –
Gheorghe Brega, Acting Prime Minister of Moldova (2015–2016)
Pavel Filip, Prime Minister of Moldova (2016–2019)

Monarch – Albert II, Sovereign Prince of Monaco (2005–present)
Prime Minister –
Gilles Tonelli, Acting Minister of State of Monaco (2015–2016)
Serge Telle, Minister of State of Monaco (2016–2020)

President – Filip Vujanović, President of Montenegro (2003–2018)
Prime Minister –
Milo Đukanović, Prime Minister of Montenegro (2012–2016)
Duško Marković, Prime Minister of Montenegro (2016–2020)
 (unrecognised, secessionist state)
President – Bako Sahakyan, President of Nagorno-Karabakh (2007–2020)
Prime Minister – Arayik Harutyunyan, Prime Minister of Nagorno-Karabakh (2007–2017)

Monarch – Willem-Alexander, King of the Netherlands (2013–present)
 (constituent country)
Prime Minister – Mark Rutte, Prime Minister of the Netherlands (2010–present)
 (constituent country)
see under North America
 (constituent country)
see under North America
 (constituent country)
see under North America
 (unrecognised, secessionist state)
President – Mustafa Akıncı, President of Northern Cyprus (2015–2020)
Prime Minister –
Ömer Kalyoncu, Prime Minister of Northern Cyprus (2015–2016)
Hüseyin Özgürgün, Prime Minister of Northern Cyprus (2016–2018)

Monarch – Harald V, King of Norway (1991–present)
Prime Minister – Erna Solberg, Prime Minister of Norway (2013–2021)

President – Andrzej Duda, President of Poland (2015–present)
Prime Minister – Beata Szydło, Chairman of the Council of Ministers of Poland (2015–2017)

President –
Aníbal Cavaco Silva, President of Portugal (2006–2016)
Marcelo Rebelo de Sousa, President of Portugal (2016–present)
Prime Minister – António Costa, Prime Minister of Portugal (2015–present)

President – Klaus Iohannis, President of Romania (2014–present)
Prime Minister – Dacian Cioloș, Prime Minister of Romania (2015–2017)

President – Vladimir Putin, President of Russia (2012–present)
Prime Minister – Dmitry Medvedev, Chairman of the Government of Russia (2012–2020)

Captains-Regent –
Lorella Stefanelli and Nicola Renzi, Captains Regent of San Marino (2015–2016)
Gian Nicola Berti and Massimo Andrea Ugolini, Captains Regent of San Marino (2016)
Marino Riccardi and Fabio Berardi, Captains Regent of San Marino (2016–2017)

President – Tomislav Nikolić, President of Serbia (2012–2017)
Prime Minister – Aleksandar Vučić, Prime Minister of Serbia (2014–2017)

President – Andrej Kiska, President of Slovakia (2014–2019)
Prime Minister – Robert Fico, Prime Minister of Slovakia (2012–2018)

President – Borut Pahor, President of Slovenia (2012–present)
Prime Minister – Miro Cerar, Prime Minister of Slovenia (2014–2018)
 (partially recognised, secessionist state)
President – Leonid Tibilov, President of South Ossetia (2012–2017)
Prime Minister – Domenty Kulumbegov, Prime Minister of South Ossetia (2014–2017)

Monarch – Felipe VI, King of Spain (2014–present)
Prime Minister – Mariano Rajoy, President of the Government of Spain (2011–2018)

Monarch – Carl XVI Gustaf, King of Sweden (1973–present)
Prime Minister – Stefan Löfven, Prime Minister of Sweden (2014–2021)

Council – Federal Council of Switzerland
Members – Doris Leuthard (2006–present), Ueli Maurer (2009–present), Didier Burkhalter (2009–present), Johann Schneider-Ammann (2010–present; President of Switzerland, 2016), Simonetta Sommaruga (2010–present), Alain Berset (2012–present), and Guy Parmelin (2016–present)
 (unrecognised, secessionist state)
President –
Yevgeny Shevchuk, President of Transnistria (2011–2016)
Vadim Krasnoselsky, President of Transnistria (2016–present)
Prime Minister –
Pavel Prokudin, Prime Minister of Transnistria (2015–2016)
Aleksandr Martynov, Prime Minister of Transnistria (2016–present)

President – Petro Poroshenko, President of Ukraine (2014–2019)
Prime Minister –
 Arseniy Yatsenyuk, Prime Minister of Ukraine (2014–2016)
Volodymyr Groysman, Prime Minister of Ukraine (2016–2019)

Monarch – Elizabeth II, Queen of the United Kingdom (1952–2022)
Prime Minister –
David Cameron, Prime Minister of the United Kingdom (2010–2016)
Theresa May, Prime Minister of the United Kingdom (2016–2019)

Monarch – Pope Francis, Sovereign of Vatican City (2013–present)
Head of Government – Cardinal Giuseppe Bertello, President of the Governorate of Vatican City (2011–2021)
Holy See (sui generis subject of public international law)
Secretary of State – Cardinal Pietro Parolin, Cardinal Secretary of State (2013–present)

North America
 (Overseas Territory of the United Kingdom)
Governor – Christina Scott, Governor of Anguilla (2013–2017)
Chief Minister – Victor Banks, Chief Minister of Anguilla (2015–2019)

Monarch – Elizabeth II, Queen of Antigua and Barbuda (1981–present)
Governor-General – Sir Rodney Williams, Governor-General of Antigua and Barbuda (2014–present)
Prime Minister – Gaston Browne, Prime Minister of Antigua and Barbuda (2014–present)
 (constituent country of the Kingdom of the Netherlands)
Governor – Fredis Refunjol, Governor of Aruba (2004–2016)
Prime Minister – Mike Eman, Prime Minister of Aruba (2009–present)

Monarch – Elizabeth II, Queen of the Bahamas (1973–present)
Governor-General – Dame Marguerite Pindling, Governor-General of the Bahamas (2014–2019)
Prime Minister – Perry Christie, Prime Minister of the Bahamas (2012–2017)

Monarch – Elizabeth II, Queen of Barbados (1966–2021)
Governor-General – Sir Elliott Belgrave, Governor-General of Barbados (2012–2017)
Prime Minister – Freundel Stuart, Prime Minister of Barbados (2010–2018)

Monarch – Elizabeth II, Queen of Belize (1981–present)
Governor-General – Sir Colville Young, Governor-General of Belize (1993–2021)
Prime Minister – Dean Barrow, Prime Minister of Belize (2008–2020)
 (Overseas Territory of the United Kingdom)
Governor –
George Fergusson, Governor of Bermuda (2012–2016)
Ginny Ferson, Acting Governor of Bermuda (2016)
John Rankin, Governor of Bermuda (2016–present)
Premier – Michael Dunkley, Premier of Bermuda (2014–2017)
 (Overseas Territory of the United Kingdom)
Governor – John Duncan, Governor of the British Virgin Islands (2014–2017)
Premier – Orlando Smith, Premier of the British Virgin Islands (2011–2019)

Monarch – Elizabeth II, Queen of Canada (1952–present)
Governor-General – David Johnston, Governor General of Canada (2010–2017)
Prime Minister – Justin Trudeau, Prime Minister of Canada (2015–present)
 (Overseas Territory of the United Kingdom)
Governor – Helen Kilpatrick, Governor of the Cayman Islands (2013–2018)
Premier – Alden McLaughlin, Premier of the Cayman Islands (2013–present)

President – Luis Guillermo Solís, President of Costa Rica (2014–p2018)

Communist Party Leader – Raúl Castro, First Secretary of the Communist Party of Cuba (2011–2021)
President – Raúl Castro, President of the Council of State of Cuba (2008–2018)
Prime Minister – Raúl Castro, President of the Council of Ministers of Cuba (2008–2018)
 (constituent country of the Kingdom of the Netherlands)
Governor – Lucille George-Wout, Governor of Curaçao (2013–present)
Prime Minister –
 Ben Whiteman, Prime Minister of Curaçao (2015–2016)
 Hensley Koeiman, Prime Minister of Curaçao (2016–2017)

President – Charles Savarin, President of Dominica (2013–present)
Prime Minister – Roosevelt Skerrit, Prime Minister of Dominica (2004–present)

President – Danilo Medina, President of the Dominican Republic (2012–present)

President – Salvador Sánchez Cerén, President of El Salvador (2014–2019)

Monarch – Elizabeth II, Queen of Grenada (1974–2022)
Governor-General – Dame Cécile La Grenade, Governor-General of Grenada (2013–present)
Prime Minister – Keith Mitchell, Prime Minister of Grenada (2013–2022)

President –
Alejandro Maldonado, Acting President of Guatemala (2015–2016)
Jimmy Morales, President of Guatemala (2016–2020)

President –
Michel Martelly, President of Haiti (2011–2016)
Evans Paul, Head of State of Haiti (2016)
Jocelerme Privert, Acting President of Haiti (2016–2017)
Prime Minister –
Evans Paul, Prime Minister of Haiti (2015–2016)
Fritz Jean, Prime Minister of Haiti (2016)
Enex Jean-Charles, Prime Minister of Haiti (2016–2017)

President – Juan Orlando Hernández, President of Honduras (2014–2022)

Monarch – Elizabeth II, Queen of Jamaica (1962–2022)
Governor-General – Sir Patrick Allen, Governor-General of Jamaica (2009–present)
Prime Minister –
Portia Simpson-Miller, Prime Minister of Jamaica (2012–2016)
Andrew Holness, Prime Minister of Jamaica (2016–present)

President – Enrique Peña Nieto, President of Mexico (2012–2018)
 (Overseas Territory of the United Kingdom)
Governor – Elizabeth Carriere, Governor of Montserrat (2015–2018)
Premier – Donaldson Romeo, Premier of Montserrat (2014–2019)

President – Daniel Ortega, President of Nicaragua (2007–present)

President – Juan Carlos Varela, President of Panama (2014–2019)
 (Commonwealth of the United States)
Governor – Alejandro García Padilla, Governor of Puerto Rico (2013–2017)
  (overseas collectivity of France)
Prefect – Anne Laubies, Prefect of Saint Barthélemy (2015–2018)
Head of Government – Bruno Magras, President of the Territorial Council of Saint Barthélemy (2007–present)

Monarch – Elizabeth II, Queen of Saint Kitts and Nevis (1983–2022)
Governor-General – Sir Tapley Seaton, Governor-General of Saint Kitts and Nevis (2015–present)
Prime Minister – Timothy Harris, Prime Minister of Saint Kitts and Nevis (2015–present)

Monarch – Elizabeth II, Queen of Saint Lucia (1979–2022)
Governor-General – Dame Pearlette Louisy, Governor-General of Saint Lucia (1997–2017)
Prime Minister –
Kenny Anthony, Prime Minister of Saint Lucia (2011–2016)
Allen Chastanet, Prime Minister of Saint Lucia (2016–2021)
 (overseas collectivity of France)
Prefect – Anne Laubies, Prefect of Saint Martin (2015–2018)
Head of Government – Aline Hanson, President of the Territorial Council of Saint Martin (2013–2017)
  (overseas collectivity of France)
Prefect –
Jean-Christophe Bouvier, Prefect of Saint Pierre and Miquelon (2014–2016)
Henri Jean, Prefect of Saint Pierre and Miquelon (2016–2018)
Head of Government – Stéphane Artano, President of the Territorial Council of Saint Pierre and Miquelon (2006–2018)

Monarch – Elizabeth II, Queen of Saint Vincent and the Grenadines (1979–2022)
Governor-General – Sir Frederick Ballantyne, Governor-General of Saint Vincent and the Grenadines (2002–2019)
Prime Minister – Ralph Gonsalves, Prime Minister of Saint Vincent and the Grenadines (2001–present)
 (constituent country of the Kingdom of the Netherlands)
Governor – Eugene Holiday, Governor of Sint Maarten (2010–present)
Prime Minister – William Marlin, Prime Minister of Sint Maarten (2015–2017)

President – Anthony Carmona, President of Trinidad and Tobago (2013–2018)
Prime Minister – Keith Rowley, Prime Minister of Trinidad and Tobago (2015–present)
 (Overseas Territory of the United Kingdom)
Governor –
 Peter Beckingham, Governor of the Turks and Caicos Islands (2013–2016)
 Anya Williams, Acting Governor of the Turks and Caicos Islands (2016)
 John Freeman, Governor of the Turks and Caicos Islands (2016–2019)
Premier –
Rufus Ewing, Premier of the Turks and Caicos Islands (2012–2016)
Sharlene Cartwright-Robinson, Premier of the Turks and Caicos Islands (2016–present)

President – Barack Obama, President of the United States (2009–2017)
 (insular area of the United States)
Governor – Kenneth Mapp, Governor of the United States Virgin Islands (2015–2019)

Oceania
 (unorganised, unincorporated territory of the United States)
Governor – Lolo Matalasi Moliga, Governor of American Samoa (2013–2021)

Monarch – Elizabeth II, Queen of Australia (1952–2022)
Governor-General – Sir Peter Cosgrove, Governor-General of Australia (2014–2019)
Prime Minister – Malcolm Turnbull, Prime Minister of Australia (2015–2018)
 (external territory of Australia)
Administrator – Barry Haase, Administrator of Christmas Island (2014–2017)
Shire-President – Gordon Thomson, Shire president of Christmas Island (2013–present)
 (external territory of Australia)
Administrator – Barry Haase, Administrator of the Cocos (Keeling) Islands (2014–2017)
Shire-President – Balmut Pirus, Shire president of the Cocos (Keeling) Islands (2015–2017)
 (associated state of New Zealand)
Queen's Representative – Tom Marsters, Queen's Representative of the Cook Islands (2013–present)
Prime Minister – Henry Puna, Prime Minister of the Cook Islands (2010–2020)

President – Jioji Konrote, President of Fiji (2015–2021)
Prime Minister – Frank Bainimarama, Prime Minister of Fiji (2007–present)
  (overseas collectivity of France)
High Commissioner –
Lionel Beffre, High Commissioner of the Republic in French Polynesia (2013–2016)
Marc Tschiggfrey, Acting High Commissioner of the Republic in French Polynesia (2016)
René Bidal, High Commissioner of the Republic in French Polynesia (2016–2019)
President – Édouard Fritch, President of French Polynesia (2014–present)
 (insular area of the United States)
Governor – Eddie Baza Calvo, Governor of Guam (2011–2019)

President –
Anote Tong, President of Kiribati (2003–2016)
Taneti Mamau, President of Kiribati (2016–present)

President –
Christopher Loeak, President of the Marshall Islands (2012–2016)
Casten Nemra, President of the Marshall Islands (2016)
Hilda Heine, President of the Marshall Islands (2016–2020)

President – Peter M. Christian, President of Micronesia (2015–2019)

President – Baron Waqa, President of Nauru (2013–2019)
  (sui generis collectivity of France)
High Commissioner –
Vincent Bouvier, High Commissioner of New Caledonia (2014–2016)
Laurent Cabrera, Acting High Commissioner of New Caledonia (2016)
Thierry Lataste, High Commissioner of New Caledonia (2016–2019)
Head of Government – Philippe Germain, President of the Government of New Caledonia (2015–2019)

Monarch – Elizabeth II, Queen of New Zealand (1952–2022)
Governor-General –
Sir Jerry Mateparae, Governor-General of New Zealand (2011–2016)
Dame Sian Elias, Administrator of the Government of New Zealand (2016)
Dame Patsy Reddy, Governor-General of New Zealand (2016–2021)
Prime Minister –
John Key, Prime Minister of New Zealand (2008–2016)
Bill English, Prime Minister of New Zealand (2016–2017)
 (associated state of New Zealand)
Premier – Toke Talagi, Premier of Niue (2008–present)
 (external territory of Australia)
Administrator – Gary Hardgrave, Administrator of Norfolk Island (2014–2017)
Mayor – Robin Adams, Mayor of Norfolk Island (2016–present)
 (Commonwealth of the United States)
Governor – Ralph Torres, Governor of the Northern Mariana Islands (2015–present)

President – Tommy Remengesau, President of Palau (2013–2021)

Monarch – Elizabeth II, Queen of Papua New Guinea (1975–2022)
Governor-General – Sir Michael Ogio, Governor-General of Papua New Guinea (2011–2017)
Prime Minister – Peter O'Neill, Prime Minister of Papua New Guinea (2011–2019)
 (Overseas Territory of the United Kingdom)
Governor – Jonathan Sinclair, Governor of the Pitcairn Islands (2014–2017)
Mayor – Shawn Christian, Mayor of the Pitcairn Islands (2014–2019)

Head of State – Tufuga Efi, O le Ao o le Malo of Samoa (2007–2017)
Prime Minister – Tuilaepa Aiono Sailele Malielegaoi, Prime Minister of Samoa (1998–2021)

Monarch – Elizabeth II, Queen of the Solomon Islands (1978–2022)
Governor-General – Sir Frank Kabui, Governor-General of the Solomon Islands (2009–2019)
Prime Minister – Manasseh Sogavare, Prime Minister of the Solomon Islands (2014–2017)
 (dependent territory of New Zealand)
Administrator – 
Linda Te Puni, Administrator of Tokelau (2015–2016)
David Nicholson, Administrator of Tokelau (2016–2017)
Head of Government –
Siopili Perez, Head of Government of Tokelau (2015–2016)
Afega Gaualofa, Head of Government of Tokelau (2016–2017)

Monarch – Tupou VI, King of Tonga (2012–present)
Prime Minister – ʻAkilisi Pōhiva, Prime Minister of Tonga (2014–2019)

Monarch – Elizabeth II, Queen of Tuvalu (1978–2022)
Governor-General – Sir Iakoba Italeli, Governor-General of Tuvalu (2010–2019)
Prime Minister – Enele Sopoaga, Prime Minister of Tuvalu (2013–2019)

President – Baldwin Lonsdale, President of Vanuatu (2014–2017)
Prime Minister –
Sato Kilman, Prime Minister of Vanuatu (2015–2016)
Charlot Salwai, Prime Minister of Vanuatu (2016–2020)
  (overseas collectivity of France)
Administrator – Marcel Renouf, Administrator Superior of Wallis and Futuna (2015–2017)
Head of Government – Mikaele Kulimoetoke, President of the Territorial Assembly of Wallis and Futuna (2014–2017)

South America

President – Mauricio Macri, President of Argentina (2015–present)

President – Evo Morales, President of Bolivia (2006–2019)

President –
Dilma Rousseff, President of Brazil (2011–2016)
Michel Temer, President of Brazil (2016–2018)

President – Michelle Bachelet, President of Chile (2014–2018)

President – Juan Manuel Santos, President of Colombia (2010–2018)

President – Rafael Correa, President of Ecuador (2007–2017)
 (Overseas Territory of the United Kingdom)
Governor – Colin Roberts, Governor of the Falkland Islands (2014–2017)
Chief Executive – 
 Keith Padgett, Chief Executive of the Falkland Islands (2012–2016)
 Barry Rowland, Chief Executive of the Falkland Islands (2016–present)

President – David A. Granger, President of Guyana (2015–2020)
Prime Minister – Moses Nagamootoo, Prime Minister of Guyana (2015–2020)

President – Horacio Cartes, President of Paraguay (2013–2018)

President –
Ollanta Humala, President of Peru (2011–2016)
Pedro Pablo Kuczynski, President of Peru (2016–present)
Prime Minister –
Pedro Cateriano, President of the Council of Ministers of Peru (2015–2016)
Fernando Zavala, President of the Council of Ministers of Peru (2016–2017)

President – Dési Bouterse, President of Suriname (2010–2020)

President – Tabaré Vázquez, President of Uruguay (2015–2020)

President – Nicolás Maduro, President of Venezuela (2013–present)

See also
List of vice presidents in 2016
List of current heads of state and government

Notes

References

External links
CIDOB Foundation contextualised biographies of world political leaders
Portale Storia a list of current rulers by country
Rulersa list of rulers throughout time and places
WorldStatesmenan online encyclopedia of the leaders of nations and territories

State leaders
State leaders
State leaders
2016